Sara Horowitz or Sara Hurwitz may also refer to:
 Sara Horowitz (born 1963), American union activist.
 Sara R. Horowitz (born 1951), American Holocaust literary scholar
 Sara Hurwitz, first American Orthodox woman rabbi
 Sarah Hurwitz (fl. 2008–2019), American speechwriter
 Sarah Horowitz-Sternfeld (1838-1937), notable Hasidic personality